Redhill MRT station is an above-ground Mass Rapid Transit (MRT) station on the East West line (EWL) located in Bukit Merah, Singapore.

The station is situated along Tiong Bahru Road, at the junction with Jalan Tiong. On the EWL, it's between the Tiong Bahru and Queenstown stations. The station opened on 12 March 1988, when the MRT line extended from Outram Park station to Clementi.

History
The MRTC awarded Contract 202 for the construction of Redhill and Queenstown MRT stations on 7 February 1985 for $50 million, together with the viaduct from Tiong Bahru Road to Queensway, construction starts in March 1985 for the completion in December 1987.

Redhill station opened on 12 March 1988, which is part of the Phase 1B of the MRT line. It travels from Outram Park to Clementi.

In view of accidents along the MRT line, platform screen doors were installed and started operations on 31 May 2011.

References

External links
 

Railway stations in Singapore opened in 1988
Bukit Merah
Mass Rapid Transit (Singapore) stations